The foreign relations of Spain could be constructed upon the foreign relations of the Hispanic Crown. The personal union of Castile and Aragon that ensued with the joint rule of the Catholic Monarchs was followed by the annexation of the Kingdom of Granada and the Kingdom of Navarre. The crown also built a large colonial empire in the Americas after the arrival of Columbus to the New World in 1492.

The Spanish Habsburg monarchs had large holdings across the European continent stemming from the inherited dominions of the Habsburg monarchy and from the Aragonese holdings in the Italian Peninsula. The Habsburg dynasty fought against the Protestant Reformation in the continent and achieved a dynastic unification of the realms of the Iberian Peninsula with their enthronement as Portuguese monarchs after 1580. The American colonies shipped bullion, but resources were spent in wars waged against France in Italy and elsewhere as well as in conflicts against the Ottoman Empire, England or revolts in the Spanish Netherlands, Portugal (lost after 1640) and Catalonia. Mainland Spain was the main theatre of the War of Spanish Succession (1701–1714), after which the Bourbon dynasty consolidated rule, while handing in holdings in Italy and the Netherlands. The successive Bourbon Family Compacts underpinned a close alignment with the Kingdom of France throughout the 18th century. During the Napoleonic Wars, Mainland Spain was occupied by the French Empire (which installed a puppet ruler), and became after an 1808 uprising the main theatre of the Peninsular War. Nearly all its colonies fought for and won independence in the early 19th century. From then on it kept Cuba, Puerto Rico and the Philippines, otherwise lost in 1898 after the Spanish–American War, and, in line with far-reaching efforts by other European powers, Spain began to sustain a colonial presence in the African continent, most notably in Western Sahara and Equatorial Guinea. It also intervened in Nguyễn Vietnam alongside France and involved in the affairs of former colony Santo Domingo, which briefly returned to Spanish control. In the wake of the creation of a Spanish protectorate in Northern Morocco, the early 20th century saw a draining conflict against Riffian anti-colonial resistance. Spain stuck to a status of neutrality during World War I.

The Spanish Civil War of 1936–1939 became a proxy war between the axis powers Germany and Italy and the Soviet Union (which lost). The war ensued with the installment of a dictatorship under Francisco Franco lasting until 1975. In the aftermath of World War 2, the series of multilateral agreements and institutions configuring what it is known today as Western Europe were made apart from Francoist Spain. The 1953 military agreements with the United States entailed the acceptance of unprecedented conditions vis-à-vis the (peacetime) military installment of a foreign power on Spanish soil. Spain joined the UN in 1955 and the IMF in 1958. In the last rales of the dictator, the mismanaged decolonisation of Spanish Sahara ensued with the Moroccan invasion of the territory in 1975 and the purported partition of it between Morocco and Mauritania, spawning a protracted conflict pitting the Sahrawi national liberation Polisario Front against Morocco and (briefly) Mauritania lasting to this day. Spain joined NATO (1982) and entered the European Communities (1986).

On a wide range of issues, Spain often prefers to coordinate its efforts with its EU partners through the European political cooperation mechanisms. In addition to being represented via EU membership, Spain is a permanently invited guest to all G20 summits.

History
In 218 BC the Romans invaded the Iberian peninsula, which later became the Roman province of Hispania. The Romans introduced the Latin language, the ancestor of both modern-day Spanish and Italian. The Iberian peninsula remained under Roman rule for over 600 years, until the collapse of the Western Roman Empire.

In the Early modern period, until the 18th century, southern and insular Italy came under Spanish control, having been previously a domain of the Crown of Aragon.

Charles V

Charles V (1500–1558) inherited vast lands across Western Europe and the Americas, and expanded them by frequent wars. Among other domains he was King of Spain from 1516, and Holy Roman Emperor and Archduke of Austria from 1519. As head of the rising House of Habsburg during the first half of the 16th century, his dominions in Europe extending from Germany to northern Italy with direct rule over the Austrian hereditary lands and the Burgundian Low Countries, and a unified Spain with its southern Italian kingdoms of Naples, Sicily, and Sardinia. His great enemy on land was France, on the Mediterranean Sea it was the Ottoman Empire, which at times was allied with France.  England and the Papacy were sometimes part of the coalition against him. Much of his attention focused on wars in Italy. At the Diet of Augsburg (1547) he secured recognition that the Netherlands belonged to the Hapsburg domain. However Charles was intensely Catholic and the northern Netherlands  was Protestant. He and his Spanish heirs fought for a century against Dutch independence; despite the enormous cost they failed.

Philip II, 1556–1598

Philip III, 1598–1621

Philip III has a poor reputation in terms of both domestic and foreign policy. He inherited two major conflicts from his father. The first of these, the long-running Dutch revolt, represented a serious challenge to Spanish power from the Protestant United Provinces in a crucial part of the Spanish Empire. The second, the Anglo–Spanish War was a newer, and less critical conflict with Protestant England, marked by a Spanish failure to successfully bring its huge military resources to bear on the smaller English military.

Philip's own foreign policy can be divided into three phases. For the first nine years of his reign, he pursued a highly aggressive set of policies, aiming to deliver a 'great victory'.  His instructions to his most important advisor Duke Lerma to wage a war of "blood and iron" on his rebellious subjects in the Netherlands reflects this. After 1609, when it became evident that Spain was financially exhausted and Philip sought a truce with the Dutch, there followed a period of retrenchment; in the background, tensions continued to grow, however, and by 1618 the policies of Philip's 'proconsols' were increasingly at odds with de Lerma's policy from Madrid.

War of the Spanish Succession and after 1701–1759

The War of the Spanish Succession (1701–1714) saw Spain in a nearly helpless position as multiple European powers battled for control over which of three rivals would be king.  At first most of the warfare took place outside of Spain. However, in 1704 Spain was invaded by the Germans (officially by the Holy Roman Empire including Habsburg Austria and Prussia, as well as other minor German states), Great Britain, the Dutch Republic, the Duchy of Savoy and Portugal. The invaders wanted to make the Habsburg candidate king instead of the incumbent Philip V who the grandson of France's powerful king Louis XIV and candidate of the House of Bourbon.  Spain had no real army, but it defense was a high priority for Louis XIV who sent in his French armies and after a devastating civil war eventually drove out the invaders from Spain.

After years of warfare and changing coalitions, the final result was that Philip V remained king. In practice his wife Elisabeth Farnese ruled Spain from 1714 until 1746, and was more interested in Italy than Spain. Spain was not even invited to the peace treaties (Peace of Utrecht); they forbade any future possibility of unifying the French and Spanish crowns. Britain was the main winner; it blocked France from becoming too powerful. Britain acquired Minorca and Gibraltar from Spain, as well as the right to sell slaves to Spanish colonies. Britain also gained Newfoundland and Nova Scotia from France. Spain kept its American colonies but lost its European holdings in Italy and the Spanish Netherlands (modern Belgium), mostly to Austria. Spain briefly regained some Italian holdings until the British sank its fleet in 1718. Elisabeth Farnese succeeded in recapturing Naples and Sicily. She put her son on the throne there. He abdicated in 1759 to return to Madrid as King Charles III of Spain.

American Revolutionary War: 1775–1783

Eager to gain revenge on the British for its defeat during the Seven Years' War, France offered support to rebel American colonists seeking independence from Britain during the American War of Independence and in 1778 entered the war on their side. They then urged Spain to do the same, hoping the combined force would be strong enough to overcome the British Royal Navy and be able to invade England. In 1779 Spain joined the war, hoping to take advantage of a substantially weakened Britain. Distrustful of republics, Spain did not officially recognize the new United States of America.

A well-organised force under Bernardo de Galvez operating out of Spanish Louisiana launched repeated attacks on  British colonies in the Caribbean and the Gulf of Mexico. They were easy winners against weak British garrisons, and were planning an expedition against Jamaica when peace was declared in 1783.

Spain's highest priority was to recapture Gibraltar from Britain using the Great Siege of Gibraltar. Despite a prolonged besiegement, the British garrison there was able to hold out until relieved and it remained in British hands following the Treaty of Paris. Unlike their French allies (for whom the war proved largely to be a disaster, financially and militarily) the Spanish made a number of territorial gains, recovering Florida and Menorca.

20th century 

A neutral country during World War I, Spain was not invited to take part in the 1919 Paris Peace Conference, owing to the country's relative low profile in international affairs. It was however invited to join the League of Nations as a non-permanent member and it formally did so on 14 August 1919. During the so-called Wilsonian moment in international relations, forces adversarial to the Spanish State such as the Rifis vying for international recognition of their proto-republic and the Catalan separatist movement emboldened.

Regional relations

Latin America

The Ibero-American vision 
Spain has maintained its special identification with its fellow Spanish-speaking countries. Its policy emphasizes the concept of an Ibero-American community, essentially the renewal of the historically liberal concept of "Hispano-Americanismo" (or Hispanic as it is often referred to in English), which has sought to link the Iberian peninsula to the Spanish-speaking countries in Central and South America through language, commerce, history and culture. Spain has been an effective example of transition from dictatorship to democracy, as shown in the many trips that Spain's King and prime ministers have made to the region.

Trends in diplomatic relations 
Spain maintains economic and technical cooperation programs and cultural exchanges with Latin American countries, both bilaterally and within the EU. During José María Aznar's government, Spanish relations worsened with countries like Mexico, Venezuela and Cuba, but were exceptionally good with others, like Colombia, the Dominican Republic and several Central American republics. José Luis Rodríguez Zapatero's victory in the 2004 general elections changed this setting. Despite long-standing close linguistic, economic and cultural relations with most of Latin America, some aspects of Spanish foreign policy during this time, such as its support for the Iraq War, were not supported or widely favored.

Sub-Saharan Africa 
Spain has gradually begun to broaden its contacts with Sub-Saharan Africa. It has a particular interest in its former colony of Equatorial Guinea, where it maintains a large aid program. More recently, it has sought closer relation with Senegal, Mauritania, Mali and others to find solutions for the issue of illegal immigration to the Canary Islands.

Middle East 
In the Middle East, Spain is known as a broker between powers. In its relations with the Arab world, Spain frequently supports Arab positions on Middle East issues. The Arab countries are a priority interest for Spain because of oil and gas imports and because several Arab nations have substantial investments in Spain.

Europe 
Spain has been successful in managing its relations with its three immediate European neighbours, France, Andorra, and Portugal. The accession of Spain and Portugal to the EU in 1986 has helped ease some of their periodic trade frictions by putting these into an EU context. Franco-Spanish bilateral cooperation has been enhanced by joint action against recurring violence by separatist Basque group ETA since the 1960s. Ties with the United Kingdom are generally good, although the question of Gibraltar remains a sensitive issue, especially since the UK vote on Brexit.

Asia 
Today, Spain is trying to expand its still narrow relations with East Asian nations, with China, Japan and South Korea as its main points of interest in the region.  Thailand and Indonesia are Spain's main allies in the ASEAN region, having a considerable number of agreements and a very good relationship. In the recent years Spain has also been boosting its contacts, relations and investment in other Asian countries, most notably Vietnam and Malaysia. Relations with the Philippines are, despite a very long colonial past, considerably weaker than the ones Spain has with other countries in the area, dealing mostly with cultural aspects and humanitarian assistance programs.

Disputes

Territorial disputes 
Whilst the disputed on Gibraltar with Great Britain is the best known territorial dispute of Spain, the country also has disputes with Portugal and Morocco.

With Great Britain 
Ever since it was captured in 1704 by Anglo-Dutch forces during the War of the Spanish Succession, Gibraltar has been the subject of a dispute between Britain and Spain. Situated at the southern tip of the Iberian peninsula, overseeing the Strait of Gibraltar which connects the Atlantic Ocean with the Mediterranean Sea, the territory has great strategic importance. Today, Gibraltar is a British Overseas Territory and houses an important base for the British Armed Forces.

With Morocco 
The strategic position of the Strait of Gibraltar has left a legacy of a number of sovereignty disputes. These include the "five places of sovereignty" (plazas de soberanía) on and off the coast of Morocco: the coastal enclaves of Ceuta and Melilla, which Morocco contests, as well as the islands of Peñon de Alhucemas, Peñon de Vélez de la Gomera, and Islas Chafarinas. Spain maintains sovereignty over Ceuta, Melilla, Peñon de Velez de la Gomera, Alhucemas and the Chafarinas Islands (captured following the Christian reconquest of Spain) based upon historical grounds, security reasons and on the basis of the UN principle of territorial integrity. Spain also maintains that the majority of residents are Spanish. Morocco claims these territories on the basis of the UN principles of decolonisation, territorial integrity and that Spanish arguments for the recovery of Gibraltar substantiate Morocco's claim.

With Portugal 
Olivenza (Spanish) or Olivença (Portuguese) is a town and seat of a municipality, on a disputed section of the border between Portugal and Spain, which is claimed de jure by both countries and administered de facto as part of the Spanish autonomous community of Extremadura. The population is 80% ethnic Portuguese and 30% of Portuguese language. Olivenza/Olivença was under continuous Portuguese sovereignty since 1297 until it was occupied by the Spanish in 1801 and formally ceded by Portugal later that year by the Treaty of Badajoz. Spain claims the de jure (legal) sovereignty over Olivenza/Olivença on the grounds that the Treaty of Badajoz still stands and has never been revoked. Thus, the border between the two countries in the region of Olivenza/Olivença should be as demarcated by that treaty. Portugal claims the de jure sovereignty over Olivenza/Olivença on the grounds that the Treaty of Badajoz was revoked by its own terms (the breach of any of its articles would lead to its cancellation) when Spain invaded Portugal in the Peninsular War of 1807.

Portugal further bases its case on Article 105 of the Treaty of Vienna of 1815, which Spain signed in 1817, that states that the winning countries are to "endeavour with the mightiest conciliatory effort to return Olivenza/Olivença to Portuguese authority". Thus, the border between the two countries in the region of Olivenza/Olivença should be as demarcated by the Treaty of Alcanizes of 1297. Spain interprets Article 105 as not being mandatory on demanding Spain to return Olivenza/Olivença to Portugal, thus not revoking the Treaty of Badajoz. Portugal has never made a formal claim to the territory after the Treaty of Vienna, but has equally never directly acknowledged the Spanish sovereignty over Olivenza/Olivença.  Portugal continues to claim Olivenza/Olivença, asserting that under the Vienna Treaty of 1815, Spain recognized the Portuguese claims as "legitimate". The historic disputes with Portugal over the Savage Islands in the Atlantic Ocean were resolved in recent times.

Bilateral relations

Africa

Americas

Asia

Europe

Oceania

See also
 History of Spain
 Peninsular War (1807–1814), Napoleon versus Great Britain 
 Spanish American wars of independence
 History of Spain (1810–1873)
 Spain during World War I
 France–Spain relations
 History of French foreign relations
 Italy–Spain relations
 Portugal–Spain relations
 Russia–Spain relations
 Spain–Turkey relations
 Spain–United Kingdom relations
 History of the foreign relations of the United Kingdom
 Spain–United States relations
 List of diplomatic missions in Madrid
 List of diplomatic missions in Spain
 List of diplomatic missions of Spain
 Spanish Institute for Foreign Trade

References

Further reading
 Aznar, José María. Eight Years as Prime Minister: A Personal Vision of Spain 1996-2004 (Barcelona: Planeta, 2005).
 Basora, Adrian A. "US-Spain relations from the perspective of 2009." CIDOB International yearbook (2009): 90–95. online
 Chari, Raj S., and Paul M. Heywood. "Institutions, European Integration, and the Policy Process in Contemporary Spain." in Democracy and Institutional Development (Palgrave Macmillan, London, 2008) pp. 178–202.
 Closa, Carlos, and Paul M. Heywood, eds. Spain and the European Union (Palgrave Macmillan, 2004).
 Esteban, Mario. "Spain's Relations with China: Friends but not Partners." Chinese Political Science Review 1.2 (2016): 373–386 online.
 Garcia Cantalapiedra, David, and Ramon Pacheco Pardo, Contemporary Spanish Foreign Policy (Routledge, 2014). text
 
 Gold, Peter. "Sovereignty negotiations and Gibraltar's military facilities: How two “red-line” issues became three." Diplomacy and Statecraft 15.2 (2004): 375-384. Covers 2001 to 2003.

 Heywood, Paul M. "Desperately seeking influence: Spain and the war in Iraq." European Political science 3.1 (2003): 35–40.
 
 Woodworth, Paddy. "Spain Changes Course: Aznar's Legacy, Zapatero's Prospects." World Policy Journal (Summer 2004): 8–26.

Historical
 Black, Jeremy.  The Rise of the European Powers, 1679–1793 (1990)  excerpt and text search, 220pp
 Byrnes, Mark. "Unfinished business: The United States and Franco's Spain, 1944–47." Diplomacy and Statecraft 11.1 (2000): 129–162.

 Carrió-Invernizzi, Diana. "A new diplomatic history and the networks of Spanish diplomacy in the Baroque Era." International History Review 36.4 (2014): 603–618.

 Cortada, James W. Spain in the Nineteenth-Century World: Essays on Spanish Diplomacy, 1789–1898 (1994)
 Cortada, James W. Spain in the Twentieth-Century World: Essays on Spanish Diplomacy, 1898–1978 (1980)
 Cortada, James W. Two Nations Over Time : Spain and the United States, 1776–1977 (1977) online
 Cortada, James W. A Bibliographic Guide to Spanish Diplomatic History, 1460–1977 (Greenwood Press, 1977) 390 pages
 Dadson, Trevor J. Britain, Spain and the Treaty of Utrecht 1713–2013 (2014).

 del Campo, Luis Martínez. Cultural Diplomacy: A Hundred Years of the British-Spanish Society (2016).
 Edwards, Jill. The British Government and the Spanish Civil War, 1936–1939 (2014).

 Elliott, J. H. Imperial Spain: 1469–1716 (2002) excerpt and text search
 Elliott, J. H.  Spain, Europe and the Wider World 1500–1800 (2009) excerpt and text search
 Finucane, Adrian. The Temptations of Trade: Britain, Spain, and the Struggle for Empire (2016).
 Gipson, Lawrence Henry. "British diplomacy in the light of Anglo-Spanish New World issues, 1750–1757." American Historical Review 51.4 (1946): 627–648. online
 Gold, Peter. Gibraltar: British or Spanish? (2005).
 Hayes, Paul. Modern British Foreign Policy: The Nineteenth Century 1814–80 (1975) pp. 133–54.
 Kamen, Henry. Empire: How Spain Became a World Power, 1492–1763 (2004).
 Kamen, Henry. "Vicissitudes of a world power 1500–1900" in Raymond Carr, ed, Spain: A History (2000) pp. 152–72.
 Kern, Robert W. and Meredith D. Dodge, eds. Historical dictionary of modern Spain, 1700–1988 (1990)

 Langer, William. An Encyclopedia of World History (5th ed. 1973), very detailed outline
 Liedtke, Boris N. Embracing a dictatorship: US Relations with Spain, 1945–53 (Macmillan, 1998).
 Lovett, Gabriel H. Napoleon and the Birth of Modern Spain (1965) online
 Lozano, Cristina Bravo. Spain and the Irish Mission, 1609–1707 (Routledge, 2018).
 Mckay, Derek and H.M. Scott. The Rise of the Great Powers 1648–1815 (1983) online
 Merriman, R. B. The Rise of the Spanish Empire in the Old World and in the New (4 vols, 1918) online free vol 1-2-4
 Mowat, R. B. A History of European Diplomacy, 1451–1789 (1928), basic introduction online
 New Cambridge Modern History vol III. The Counter-Reformation and price revolution, 1559–1610 (1968) ed by R. B. Wernham; ch 6, 9, 17
 New Cambridge Modern History vol IV. The Decline of Spain and the Thirty Years War 1609–48/59 (1970) ed, by J. P. Cooper, ch 9, 15,23
 Parker, Geoffrey. Philip II (4th ed. 2002)   excerpt and text search
 Parker, Geoffrey. Emperor: A New Life of Charles V (2019) excerpt
 Parker, Geoffrey. The Grand Strategy of Philip II (2000) online
 Payne, Stanley G. The Franco Regime, 1936–1975 (1987) online
 Payne, Stanley G. A History of Spain and Portugal (2 vol 1973) vol 1 to 1699 online
 Petrie, Charles.  Earlier Diplomatic History 1492–1713 (1949) of Europe
 Sanz, Porfirio. "England and Spanish foreign policy during the 1640s." European History Quarterly 28.3 (1998): 291–310.
 Slape, Emily, ed. The Spanish Empire: A Historical Encyclopedia (2 vol ABC-CLIO, 2016).
 Whealey, Robert H. Hitler and Spain: The Nazi Role in the Spanish Civil War, 1936–1939 (University Press of Kentucky, 2004).